William Mackey Wherry (September 13, 1836 – November 3, 1918) was an American brigadier general, author and recipient of the Medal of Honor,

Biography
Wherry was born in St. Louis, Missouri. He served on the frontier against the Indians and during the Spanish–American War. Wherry retired at the rank of brigadier general in the United States Army. Wherry is the author of "Lyon's Campaign in Missouri".

While serving in the American Civil War, as a First Lieutenant of Company D, 3rd Missouri Volunteer Infantry and aide-de-camp to Nathaniel Lyon. Wherry received the Medal of Honor for actions at the Battle of Wilson's Creek on August 10, 1861. Wherry's Medal of Honor was issued after the war on October 30, 1895 with the citation "Displayed conspicuous coolness and heroism in rallying troops that were recoiling under heavy fire".

After the Civil War, Wherry served as a Brevet Colonel while assigned to Headquarters First Military District in Richmond, Virginia.

Wherry was promoted to lieutenant colonel, 2nd United States Infantry on 29 December 1894.  At the onset of the Spanish–American War he took command of the 22nd Infantry when regimental commander Col John C. Bates was promoted to brigadier general of an Independent Brigade consisting of the 3rd Infantry Regiment and 20th Infantry Regiment.  He commanded the regiment until he was promoted to colonel of the 8th Infantry on 30 August 1898. He was transferred to the 17th Infantry the following month.

Wherry was appointed brigadier general of volunteers September 21, 1898 and discharged from the volunteers on November 30, 1898. Wherry was appointed brigadier general in the Regular Army on January 7, 1899 and retired on January 18, 1899.

Wherry died on November 3, 1918 in Cincinnati, Ohio, and was buried at Bellefontaine Cemetery in St. Louis.

See also

List of Medal of Honor recipients

Notes

References
 Eicher, John H., and David J. Eicher, Civil War High Commands. Stanford: Stanford University Press, 2001. .
 The Last King of Hawaii, Merrie Monarch King Kalakaua Signed Document Initiating Civil War Colonel William M. Wherry Into the Royal Order of Kamehameha

1836 births
1918 deaths
Writers from St. Louis
People of Missouri in the American Civil War
Union Army officers
United States Army generals
United States Army Medal of Honor recipients
American military writers
American Civil War recipients of the Medal of Honor